Tadija Kačar (born 5 January 1956 in Peručica, near Jajce, Bosnia and Herzegovina) is a retired Bosnian Serb boxer who represented Yugoslavia at the 1976 Summer Olympics in Montréal, Canada. There he won the silver medal in the light middleweight division (– 71 kg), after being defeated in the final by Poland's Jerzy Rybicki. Winner of the silver medal at the European Championship 1979th Cologne, Winner at the Mediterranean Games 1979th Split.

Tadija Kačar captured the silver medal at the second World Championships in Belgrade. He is the older brother of boxer Slobodan Kačar, who won a gold medal at the 1980 Summer Olympics.

Olympic results
 Defeated Poul Frandsen (Denmark), 5:0
 Defeated Mohammad Azarhazin (Iran), 5:0
 Defeated Vasile Didea (Romania), 5:0
 Defeated Rolando Garbey (Cuba), 4:1
 Lost to Jerzy Rybicki (Poland), 5:0

References

 databaseOlympics.com
 Profile on Serbian Olympic Committee

1956 births
Living people
People from Central Bosnia Canton
Bosnia and Herzegovina male boxers
Serbian male boxers
Light-middleweight boxers
Olympic boxers of Yugoslavia
Boxers at the 1976 Summer Olympics
Medalists at the 1976 Summer Olympics
Olympic silver medalists for Yugoslavia
Olympic medalists in boxing
Yugoslav male boxers
AIBA World Boxing Championships medalists
Serbs of Bosnia and Herzegovina

Mediterranean Games gold medalists for Yugoslavia
Competitors at the 1979 Mediterranean Games
Mediterranean Games medalists in boxing